Qoçaqqazma is a village in the municipality of Pirquluoba in the Khachmaz Rayon of Azerbaijan.

References

Populated places in Khachmaz District